Acacia piligera, also known as grub-pod wattle, is a tree or shrub belonging to the genus Acacia and the subgenus Phyllodineae native to eastern Australia.

Description
It has erect branches that curve upwards and glabrous to sparsely hairy branchlets. The grey-green to green phyllodes are widely spreading and rotated on the branchlets. It flowers sporadically through the year and produces inflorescences that have spherical flower-heads with a diameter of  containing 20 to 32 yellow to deep yellow flowers.

Taxonomy
The shrub can be mistaken as Acacia uncinata, it also resembles Acacia sertiformis. The specific epithet is thought to be in reference to the downy appearance of the shrub.

Distribution
It is endemic to eastern New South Wales from around the Hunter Valley in the north to the Hunter Range in the south where it is found growing in stony sandy loams derived from sandstone soils in woodland communities.

See also
 List of Acacia species

References

piligera
Flora of New South Wales
Plants described in 1835